Margaret Elizabeth Ashley-Towle (1902/1903 – November 2, 1985) was possibly the earliest professional woman in Southeast archaeology. She was born in Atlanta, Georgia to Claude Lordawick Ashley, a chief of the Atlanta city council, and Elizabeth Miller, the daughter of Captain Hiram Miller, a veteran of the Federal army.

Education and career
After graduating from Oglethorpe University in Atlanta with an A.B. in English literature and a minor in journalism in 1924, Ashley enrolled in Columbia University, pursuing a graduate degree in anthropology. While at Columbia, she studied under Franz Boas. In 1926, Ashley began work at what is now known as the Shinholser site (9Bl12) in Baldwin County, Georgia.

In July 1927, she began working on her master's thesis topic, “An Archaeological Survey of Georgia”.  By September of that year, already recognized as an expert in her field, Ashley was asked to organize a department of archaeology for Emory University and to represent Emory in Warren K. Moorehead’s excavations at the Etowah site in northern Georgia. Ashley accepted this position and left her official studies at Columbia.

While working for Emory, Ashley, along with Frank T. Schnell Sr., performed significant excavations at Lockett Mound, now known as the Neisler site (9Tr1), located near the Flint River. Ashley and Schnell spent three weeks at Neisler, performing major trench excavation atop the mound and surveying 250 test units. Two fire pits were uncovered on the mound and fourteen burials excavated in the outlying area.

On February 18, 1930, Ashley married Gerald Towle, a Harvard graduate and Moorehead's top field assistant. Upon her marriage, Margaret abandoned archaeology for some fourteen years, never to resume field work in Georgia.

In 1944, after Gerald's death, she started volunteering at the Harvard Botanical Museum. In the late 1940s, Ashley returned to the graduate program in anthropology at Columbia, this time focusing on ethnobotany and working with Duncan Strong. In 1958, Ashley completed her dissertation, The Ethnobotany of Pre-Columbian Peru as Evidenced by Archaeological Materials, and received her Ph.D.

Upon completing her studies at Columbia, Ashley worked for the Harvard Botanical Museum as an unpaid associate until her death on November 2, 1985.

References

Further reading

 White, Nancy Marie, Sullivan, Lynne P., and Marrinan, Rochelle A., eds. Grit-Tempered: Early Women Archaeologists in the Southeastern United States. Tallahassee: University Press of Florida, 1999.

1900s births
1985 deaths
Oglethorpe University alumni
Columbia Graduate School of Arts and Sciences alumni
Emory University faculty
Harvard University people
American women archaeologists
20th-century American archaeologists
20th-century American writers
20th-century American women writers
20th-century American women scientists
American women academics